Sir John Walter Smythe, 8th Baronet (7 November 1827 – 5 March 1919) was an English first-class cricketer and British Army officer.

The son of Sir Edward Joseph Smythe, he was born in November 1827 at the Smythe family home, Acton Burnell Castle in Shropshire. He was educated at Downside School. Smythe served as an officer in the Louth Rifles. He was promoted to captain in November 1845. A latecomer to first-class cricket, Smythe made his first-class debut for the Marylebone Cricket Club (MCC) against Oxford University at the age of 50 in June 1878. He played first-class matches for the MCC until 1885, making five appearances. He scored 122 runs in his five matches, with a highest score of 35, while as a bowler he took 2 wickets. He succeeded to the Smyth baronetcy as the 8th Baronet upon the death of his brother, Sir Charles Smythe in November 1897. He was nominated for High Sheriff of Shropshire in 1904, but was not chosen. Smythe died at Acton Burnell in March 1919. He was succeeded as the 9th Baronet by Sir Edward Smythe.

References

External links

1827 births
1919 deaths
Military personnel from Shropshire
Baronets in the Baronetage of the United Kingdom
People educated at Downside School
Royal Lincolnshire Regiment officers
English cricketers
Marylebone Cricket Club cricketers
Sportspeople from Shropshire